Lecithocera luticostella is a moth in the family Lecithoceridae. It was described by Turati in 1926. It is found in Libya.

References

Moths described in 1926
luticostella